Drone warfare is a form of aerial warfare using unmanned combat aerial vehicles (UCAV) or weaponized commercial unmanned aerial vehicles (UAV). The United States, United Kingdom, Israel, China, South Korea, Iran, Italy, France, India, Pakistan, Russia, Turkey, and Poland are known to have manufactured operational UCAVs as of 2019. As of 2022, the Ukrainian enterprise Ukroboronprom and NGO group Aerorozvidka have built strike-capable drones and used them in combat.
 
Drone attacks can be conducted by commercial UCAVs dropping bombs, firing a missile, or crashing into a target. Since the turn of the century, most drone strikes have been carried out by the US military in such countries as Afghanistan, Pakistan, Syria, Iraq, Somalia, Yemen and Libya using air-to-surface missiles, but drone warfare has increasingly been deployed by Russia, Ukraine, Turkey, Azerbaijan and by militant groups such as the Houthis. Drones strikes are used for assassinations by several countries.

In 2020 a Turkish-made UAV loaded with explosives detected and attacked Haftar's forces in Libya with artificial intelligence and without command, according to a report from the UN Security Council's Panel of Experts on Libya published in March 2021. It was considered the first attack carried out by an AI UAV.

Drone warfare

The Economist has cited Azerbaijan's highly effective use of drones in the 2020 Nagorno-Karabakh war and Turkey's use of drones in the Syrian Civil War as indicating the future of warfare. Noting that it had previously been assumed that drones would not play a major role in conflicts between nations due to their vulnerability to anti-aircraft fire, it suggested that while this might be true for major powers with air defences, it was less true for minor powers. It noted Azerbaijani tactics and Turkey's use of drones as indicating a "new, more affordable type of air power". It also noted that the ability of drones to record their kills enabled a highly effective Azerbaijani propaganda campaign.

Commercial UCAVs may be equipped with such weapons as guided bombs, cluster bombs, incendiary devices, air-to-surface missiles, air-to-air missiles, anti-tank guided missiles or other types of precision-guided munitions, autocannons and machine guns. Drone attacks can be conducted by commercial UCAVs dropping bombs, firing a missile, or crashing into a target. Commercial unmanned aerial vehicles (UAVs) can be weaponized by being loaded with dangerous explosives and then crashed into vulnerable targets or detonated above them. They can conduct aerial bombing by dropping hand grenades, mortar shell or other improvised explosive munitions directly above targets. Payloads could include explosives, shrapnel, chemical, radiological or biological hazards. Multiple drones may attack simultaneously in a drone swarm. Drones have been used extensively by both sides for recon and artillery spotting in the Russo-Ukraine War.

Anti-UAV systems are being developed by states to counter the threat of drone strikes. This is, however, proving difficult. According to James Rogers, an academic who studies drone warfare, "There is a big debate out there at the moment about what the best way is to counter these small UAVs, whether they are used by hobbyists causing a bit of a nuisance or in a more sinister manner by a terrorist actor."

On 13 October 2022, a Ukrainian MiG-29 became the first manned plane to go down to a drone during combat. The pilot is claimed to have destroyed a Shahed-136 drone with his cannon. The blast is believed to have brought the plane down and hospitalised the pilot.

United States drone strikes

Estimates for the total people killed in U.S. drone strikes in Pakistan, range from 2,000–3,500 militants killed and 158–965 civilians killed. 81 insurgent leaders in Pakistan have been killed. Drone strikes in Yemen are estimated to have killed 846–1,758 militants and 116–225 civilians. 57 Al-Qaeda in the Arabian Peninsula leaders are confirmed to have been killed.

In August 2018, Al Jazeera reported that a Saudi Arabian-led coalition combating Houthi rebels in Yemen had secured secret deals with al-Qaeda in Yemen and recruited hundreds of that group's fighters:"... Key figures in the deal-making said the United States was aware of the arrangements and held off on drone attacks against the armed group, which was created by Osama bin Laden in 1988."

After US president Donald Trump had heavily increased drone strikes by over 400% and limited civilian oversight, his successor Joe Biden reversed course. Under Biden, drone strikes reportedly hit a 20-year low and were heavily limited. However, a Biden administration drone strike in Kabul, Afghanistan in August 2021 killed 10 civilians, including seven children. Later, a drone strike killed Al-Qaeda leader Ayman al-Zawahiri under the Biden administration.

Effects
Scholarly opinions are mixed regarding the efficacy of drone strikes. Some studies support that decapitation strikes to kill a terrorist or insurgent group's leadership limit the capabilities of these groups in the future, while other studies refute this. Drone strikes are successful at suppressing militant behavior, though this response is in anticipation of a drone strike rather than as a result of one. Data from the US and Pakistan's joint counter-terrorism efforts show that militants cease communication and attack planning to avoid detection and targeting.

Proponents of drone strikes assert that drone strikes are largely effective in targeting specific combatants. Some scholars argue that drone strikes reduce the amount of civilian casualties and territorial damage when compared to other types of military force like large bombs. Military alternatives to drone strikes such as raids and interrogations can be extremely risky, time-consuming, and potentially ineffective. Relying on drone strikes does not come without risks as U.S. drone usage sets an international precedent on extraterritorial and extrajudicial killings.

Islamic State drone strikes
Small drones and quadcopters have been used for strikes by the Islamic State in Iraq and Syria. A group of twelve or more have been piloted by specially trained pilots to drop munitions onto enemy forces. They have been able to evade ground defense forces.

During the battle for Mosul, the Islamic State was able to kill or wound dozens of Iraqi soldiers by dropping light explosives or 40-millimeter grenades from numerous drones attacking at the same time. Drone strikes were also used to destroy military supplies. Drone footage released by the Islamic State showed bombs being dropped on an ammunitions facility located in Deir ez-Zor, Syria, an area of contested control between the Islamic State and the Syrian government at the time. 

In 2017, FBI Director Christopher Wray stated at a Senate hearing that "We do know that terrorist organizations have an interest in using drones... We have seen that overseas already with some frequency. I think that the expectation is that it is coming here, imminently."

Drone expert Brett Velicovich discussed the dangers of the Islamic State utilizing off the shelf drones to attack civilian targets, claiming in an interview with Fox News that it was only a matter of time before ISIS extremists use of drones to strike civilian targets would become more prevalent and sophisticated.

The overall success rate for drone strikes used by the Islamic State is unclear. The Islamic State may have used drones as a way to gather footage for propaganda purposes, rather than for their military value.

Azerbaijan drone warfare

During the 2020 Nagorno-Karabakh conflict, UCAVs have been used extensively by the Azerbaijani Army against the Armenian Army. These UCAVs included Israeli IAI Harops and Turkish Bayraktar TB2s. As the Bayraktar TB2 uses Canadian optics and laser targeting systems, in October 2020 Canada suspended export of its military drone technology to Turkey after allegations that the technology had been used to collect intelligence and direct artillery and missile fire at military positions. After the incident, Aselsan stated that it would begin the serial production and integration of the CATS system to replace the Canadian MX15B.

Ukrainian war 
During the 2022 Russian invasion of Ukraine, both sides have utilised drones in combat and for reconnaissance, and drones have played an important role in offensives. Ukrainian forces have made extensive use of the Turkish-made Bayraktar TB2 drone throughout the conflict in strikes against Russian forces. Russian forces meanwhile launched waves of Iranian HESA Shahed 136 drones during the October 2022 missile strikes on Ukraine. The main roles of drones in the war, however, are in reconnaissance and artillery spotting. Russian sources claimed to have used a "Stupor anti-drone rifle" to jam the radio controls of Ukrainian drones.

On October 13th, 2022, the first recorded instance of an unarmed drone-on-drone combat encounter occurred above the Donetsk region of Ukraine. A Ukrainian DJI Mavic quadcopter was recorded ramming a Russian drone of the same model, resulting in the latter crashing towards the surface below. Another instance of this aerial ramming tactic occurred on November 24, 2022, this time with the Russian DJI Mavic being recorded plummeting towards the ground after a collision with a Ukrainian drone.

The average HESA Shahed 136 drone is worth about $20,000. An IRIS-T missile is worth about $430,000 each in comparison. From 13 September until 17 October, open source information suggests that Ukraine has had to spend $28.14 million on defending against these drones.

It is likely that Ukrainian combatants are making extensive use of the Delta networking system to enhance situational awareness in concert with drone operations.

Notable drone strikes

2006 Damadola airstrike
2008 Miramshah airstrike
2009 Makin airstrike
2011 Datta Khel airstrike
2019 Anad base drone strike
2019 Abqaiq-Khurais attack
2020 Assassination of Qasem Soleimani
2022 Assassination of Ayman al-Zawahiri
2022 Pakistan drone strikes in Afghanistan

Strikes using small and loitering UAVs

Swarm drone attacks on Khmeimim Air Base
2018 Caracas drone attack, allegedly by weaponized commercial drones, while Nicolás Maduro, the President of Venezuela, was addressing the Bolivarian National Guard.
October 2022 missile strikes on Ukraine

Notable deaths from drone strikes

Abdul Rauf (Taliban governor)
Abdulrahman al-Awlaki
Abu Khayr al-Masri
Abu Mahdi al-Muhandis
Abu Muslim al-Turkmani
Abu Umar al-Tunisi
Abu Zubair al-Masri
Akhtar Mansour
Ali Awni al-Harzi
Anwar al-Awlaki
Ayman al-Zawahiri
Baitullah Mehsud
Fahd al-Quso
Fazlullah (militant leader)
Hakimullah Mehsud
Harith bin Ghazi al-Nadhari
Ibrahim Sulayman Muhammad Arbaysh
İsmail Özden
Jihadi John
Junaid Hussain
Kamal Derwish
Mangal Bagh
Mohammed Atef
Muhsin al-Fadhli
Nasir al-Wuhayshi
Nasser bin Ali al-Ansi
Qaed Salim Sinan al-Harethi
Qasem Soleimani
Rashid Rauf
Said Ali al-Shihri
Saleh Ali al-Sammad
Sally-Anne Jones
Samir Khan

See also

PlayStation mentality
Public opinion about US drone attacks

References

External links

Aerial bombing
Airstrikes
Targeting (warfare)
Aerial warfare strategy
 
Attacks by method